Postal codes in Bhutan are five digit numbers.

References

External links
Bhutan Postal Corporation Limited

Bhutan
Postal system of Bhutan
Bhutan